Catteau is a surname. Notable people with the surname include: 

Aloïs Catteau (1877–1939), Belgian road racing cyclist
Charles Catteau (1880–1966), French Art Déco industrial designer
Robert Catteau, namesake of the Athénée Robert Catteau